Theethum Nandrum is a 2021 Indian Tamil action drama film written and directed by Rasu Ranjith. He also edited the film and featured in the lead role alongside actresses Aparna Balamurali and Lijomol Jose. The film was released on 12 March 2021.

Plot
Dass (Eesan), Siva (Rasu Ranjith), and Maaran (Sandeep Raj) are burglars who always escape the clutches of the law. Dass marries Sumathi (Aparna Balamurali), and Siva is in love with Thamizh (Lijomol Jose). One fine day, Sumathi, who is aware of Dass's livelihood is, tells him that she is pregnant and requests him to quit his illegal endeavors. Dass doesn’t oblige and secretly continues burglary with his friends and is caught by the police. After they are released from jail, they encounter challenges in their lives, with the born child being sick. Both the friends lives are in shambles. They connect with Maaran and commit one more burglary, but everything goes awry when Maaran double crosses them.

Cast
Rasu Ranjith as Siva
Aparna Balamurali as Sumathi
Lijomol Jose as Thamizh
 Eesan as Daas
 Inba Ravikumar as Aaru
 Sandeep Raj as Maaran
 Kaalayan Sathya as Rajendran
 Karunakaran as Dharmalingam

Production
Director-actor Rasu Ranjith made his directorial debut, having earlier been a part of the reality show Naalaiya Iyakkunar. In mid-2018, Aparna Balamurali and Lijomol Jose were both cast in the film after Rasu Ranjith had spotted their performances in Maheshinte Prathikaaram (2016). Although it was the first Tamil film signed by both actresses, their other films released before Theethum Nandrum.

Aparnaa Balamurali's presence in the team garnered further publicity for the team as it prepared for release in 2021. The actress had risen to fame with a pivotal role in Soorarai Pottru (2020).

Release
The film opened on 12 March 2021 across Tamil Nadu. A reviewer from Times of India wrote "though the film stands out for the way emotions have been handled between varied characters, it takes its own sweet time to establish the plot." Cinema Express gave the film a positive review, noting "this crime-thriller stands tall with its simple, straightforward storytelling and some brilliant performances" and adding "on the whole, the entire team has aided Rasu Ranjith in weaving a compelling tale".

A reviewer from Sify compared the film to Pattiyal (2006) and Subramaniapuram (2008), labelling it a "watchable gangster action thriller".

References

External links
 

2021 films
2020s Tamil-language films
Indian drama films
2021 directorial debut films